Djinn are supernatural creatures mentioned in Islamic theology.   

Djinn, Djin, or Djinni may also refer to:

Film
 Djinn (2013 film), an Emirati film by Tobe Hooper
 Djinn (2022 film), 2022 Indian Malayalam-language fantasy drama film by Sidharth Bharathan
 Djinns (film), a 2010 French-Moroccan film
 Djinn, a character from Clash of the Titans

Music
 Les Djinns (choir), a French choir
 Djinn (album), an album by Melechesh
 Djin (album), an album by Queenadreena

Other uses
 Djinn (comics), a bande dessinée by Jean Dufaux and Ana Mirallès
 Djinn (novel), a novel by Alain Robbe-Grillet
 Djinni (Dungeons & Dragons), a type of creature from Dungeons & Dragons
 Djinn (Golden Sun), creatures in the video game Golden Sun
 Sud-Ouest Djinn, a French light helicopter
 Djinn chair, a design in Modernist style by Olivier Mourgue

See also
 Genie (disambiguation)
 Geni (disambiguation)
 Jinn in popular culture
 Jinni (disambiguation)